Aedes (Finlaya) chrysolineatus is a species complex of zoophilic mosquito belonging to the genus Aedes. It is found in Sri Lanka, India, Japan, Malaya, Thailand, Indochina, Sumatra, and Java.

References

External links
Hulecoeteomyia Theobald, 1904
The Aedes (Finlaya) Chrysolineatus Group of Mosquitoes (Diptera: Culicidae)1
Notes on the Aedes (Finlaya) chrysolineatus Subgroup in Japan and Korea Diptera: Culicidae 
proposed system of classifying Aedes chrysolineatus and related species  1981
MOSQUITO STUDIES IN THE INDIAN SUBREGION

chrysolineatus